LKG may refer to:

 LKG (film), a 2019 Indian film
 LKG Tower, an office skyscraper in Makati, Philippines
 Lokichogio Airport in Kenya (IATA airport code: LKG)